Copper(II) chlorate is a chemical compound of the transition metal copper and the chlorate anion with basic formula Cu(ClO3)2. Copper chlorate is an oxidiser. It commonly forms the tetrahydrate, Cu(ClO3)2·4H2O.

Production
Copper chlorate can be made by combining a hot one molar solution of copper sulfate, with barium chlorate, which results in the precipitation of barium sulfate. When the solution is filtered, cooled and evaporated under a vacuum blue crystals form.

CuSO4 + Ba(ClO3)2 → Cu(ClO3)2 + BaSO4(s)

Properties
In 1902, A. Meusser investigated solubility of copper chlorate and found that it melted and started decomposing above 73 °C, giving off chlorine.

Copper chlorate decomposes when heated, giving off a yellow gas, which contains chlorine, oxygen and chlorine dioxide. A green solid is left that is a basic copper salt.

2 Cu(ClO3)2 → 2 CuO + Cl2 + 3 O2 + 2 ClO2

Sulfur is highly reactive with copper chlorate, and it is important not to cross contaminate these chemicals, for example in pyrotechnic making.

Structure 
Copper(II) chlorate commonly crystallizes as a tetrahydrate, though a hexahydrate is also known. Tetraaquacopper(II) chlorate, Cu(ClO3)2·4H2O, has an orthorhombic crystal structure. Each copper atom is octahedrally coordinated, surrounded by four oxygen atoms of water, and two oxygen atoms from chlorate groups, which are opposite each other. Water is closer to the copper than chlorate, 1.944 Å compared to 2.396 Å, exhibiting the Jahn-Teller effect. The chlorate groups take the shape of a distorted tetrahedron. At , the chlorine-oxygen distances in each chlorate ion are 1.498, 1.488 and 1.468 Å, with the longest being the oxygen next to copper. The ∠O-Cu-O (angle subtended at copper by oxygen atoms) is 105.2°, 108.3°, and 106.8°. At lower temperatures, the water molecules and copper-chlorate distance shrink.

Use
François-Marie Chertier used tetraamminecopper(II) chlorate to colour flames blue in 1843. This material was abbreviated TACC with formula Cu(NH3)4(ClO3)2. TACC explodes on impact.

The substance became known as Chertier'c copper for use in blue coloured pyrotechnics. However its deliquescence causes a problem. Mixtures with other metal salts can yield violet or lilac colours also.

It has also been used to colour copper brown.

References

Chlorates
Copper(II) compounds